La pasión de Isabela (English title: The passion of Isabela) is a Mexican telenovela produced by José Octavio Cano for Televisa in 1984.

Ana Martín and Héctor Bonilla starred as the protagonists, while Beatriz Aguirre and Claudio Brook starred as the antagonists.

Cast 
Ana Martín as Isabela
Héctor Bonilla as Adolfo Castanedo
Beatriz Aguirre as Celina
Claudio Brook as Bruno
Delia Casanova as Natalia
Roberto Cobo as Maestero of ceremonies
Gemma Cuervo as Zoraida
Irma Dorantes as Azucena
Margarita Gralia as Odette
Alfonso Iturralde as Sebastián
Silvia Derbez as Angela
Manuel Landeta
Lilia Aragón
Raúl Meraz as Castillo
Ana Ofelia Murguía as Cristina
Martha Navarro as Matilde
Lilia Prado as Perla
Adrián Ramos as Faustino
Anna Silvetti as Regina
Susana Kamini as Ruth
Roberto D'Amico as Ramon
Tito Vasconcelos as Goyo
Rosa Carmina as Herself
Yolanda Montes as Herself

Awards

References

External links 

1984 telenovelas
Mexican telenovelas
Televisa telenovelas
1984 Mexican television series debuts
1985 Mexican television series endings
Spanish-language telenovelas
Television shows set in Mexico City